Bunovo Peak is the rocky peak rising to 1104 m in the west foothills of Hemimont Plateau on Fallières Coast in Graham Land, Antarctica. It surmounts Forbes Glacier to the north and Kom Glacier to the south.

The peak is named after the settlements of Bunovo in Western and Southwestern Bulgaria.

Location
British mapping in 1978.

Maps
Antarctic Digital Database (ADD). Scale 1:250000 topographic map of Antarctica. Scientific Committee on Antarctic Research (SCAR). Since 1993, regularly upgraded and updated.
British Antarctic Territory. Scale 1:200000 topographic map. DOS 610 Series, Sheet W 67 66. Directorate of Overseas Surveys, Tolworth, UK, 1978.

Notes

References
 Bulgarian Antarctic Gazetteer. Antarctic Place-names Commission. (details in Bulgarian, basic data in English)
 Bunovo Peak. SCAR Composite Antarctic Gazetteer.

External links
 Bunovo Peak. Copernix satellite image

Mountains of Graham Land
Bulgaria and the Antarctic
Fallières Coast